The Libera Award for Best Americana Record (known as Best American Roots & Folk Album in 2018 to 2019 and Best Americana Album in 2020) is an award presented by the American Association of Independent Music at the annual Libera Award which recognizes "best americana album released commercially in the United States by an independent label" since 2017.

Winners and nominees

Artists that received multiple nominations
3 nominations
Calexico

2 nominations
Hiss Golden Messenger
Kevin Morby
Steve Gunn

References

Libera Awards